Locher is a surname, and may refer to:

 Carl Locher (1851–1915), Danish realist painter
 Cyrus Locher (1878–1929), Democratic politician from Ohio
 Dick Locher (1929–2017), Richard Earl Locher, cartoonist
 Eduard Locher (1840–1910), Swiss engineer, inventor and independent contractor
 James R. Locher, Assistant Secretary of Defense for Special Operations and Low-Intensity Conflict
 Michael Locher (born 1969), Swiss musician
 Ralph S. Locher (1915–2004), Romanian-born American politician of the Democratic party
 Roger Locher (born 1946), F-4D Phantom weapons officer and pilot
 Steve Locher (born 1967), Swiss alpine skier

See also
 Lochar (disambiguation)